...And I Know You Wanna Dance was Johnny Rivers's sixth official album, and was his fourth live album.  It was recorded live at the Whisky a Go Go in Los Angeles, California.  The album was on the Billboard Charts for 21 weeks, and reached #52. It included the most famous recording of "Secret Agent Man" which peaked at #3 on the Billboard Hot 100.

Track listing

Side one

Side two

(***) Edit fade-out stereo. The full 6:15 minutes only mono version was released as B-side of single "Secret Agent Man" the same year.

Personnel

Musicians
 Johnny Rivers – vocals, electric guitar
 Chuck Day – bass guitar, guitar
 Mickey Jones – drums
 Larry Knechtel – organ
 Joe Osborn – bass guitar, guitar

Technical
 Lou Adler – producer
 Bones Howe – engineer
 Woody Woodward – art direction
 Lulu – cover design
 Andy Wickham – liner notes
 Ken Kim – cover photography
 Guy Webster – photography (liner)

References

External links
 And I Know You Wanna Dance on Amazon

Johnny Rivers live albums
1966 live albums
Albums produced by Lou Adler
Albums recorded at the Whisky a Go Go
Imperial Records live albums